Station Six-Sahara is a 1963 British-West German drama film directed by Seth Holt and starring Carroll Baker, Peter van Eyck and Ian Bannen. It is a remake of the 1938 film S.O.S. Sahara, which had been based on a play by Jean Martet.

Plot
On December 9, 1962, the film Station Six Sahara premiered featuring stars Carroll Baker, Peter Van Eyck, Hansjörg Felmy and many more. Martin, played by Hansjörg Felmy, takes a job and heads out into the Sahara Desert to a pumping station in which he will work for an oil company out of the United States. The truck that Martin is riding in is carrying a coffin that is being used to transfer a worker from the oil pumping station that was killed on the job. The person in the coffin was the former owner of Martin's new job. Martin has chosen to work for 5 years for the oil company that is owned and operated by an authoritarian named Kramer. Kramer is known as a disillusioned American that has ties with Germany. Martin and Kramer start to go head-to-head with each other on many dilemmas. There are some other men that work alongside Martin. Fletcher is a noisy man that is always joking around, and the Ex-Major Macey is looked at as uptight in many circumstances. Another man that works with Martin is a Spaniard named Santos. Santos is the kind of man that is considered a "workaholic" and does not like anything outside of that messing with his work.

There are many factors that start to make the work Martin and the men are doing very tiring and gruesome. The boiling heat, the eye-drying dust, and the lack of any entertainment continue to drain the men's livelihood. The only entertainment that goes on in the base is the poker game that Kramer puts on at night in which he forces the men to play. Some workers form the local town also come out as servants to the oil drilling station. The men at the camp sometimes get some prostitutes to stay around for a while, but one day things changed when a car pulled up to the oil drilling plant. Out of the car stepped a beautiful woman named Catherine. Catherine gets stuck in a horrible situation with her ex-husband Jimmy. Jimmy owns a Cadillac convertible in which him and Catherine were going for a drive when he decides to take off and start driving with an intent to kill himself. As she speeds through the work camp, he crashes the car into a wall. Jimmy is pulled out of the car with very serious injuries while Catherine had no injuries at all. Catherine's sex appeal makes the men at the camp strive to want her to be theirs. As the men continue to drool over Catherine combined with the intense heat, there is bound to be some sort of disaster happen in the future.

Cast
 Carroll Baker as Catherine 
 Peter van Eyck as Kramer 
 Ian Bannen as Fletcher 
 Denholm Elliott as Macey 
 Hansjörg Felmy as Martin 
 Mario Adorf as Santos 
 Biff McGuire as Jimmy 
 Harry Baird as Sailor

Production
The film was part of an ambitious plan by the German production firm CCC Films to begin making films in London, which ended after only two releases.

Seth Holt said he was given the project by executive producer Gene Gutowski, saying "It was a sort of dirty film really but there was something in it that was quite interesting. Then I learnt by accident that Bryan Forbes had originally brought this subject to CCC films's attention and had promised in the little writing in the contract to do a stint at the end. He did a rewrite in four days. It wasn't perfect but it was a lot better than what I had in the first instance."

Artur Brauner's film, Station Six Sahara, is an attempt he made to build his first continuous German-British film corporation. In 1962, Brauner's film, A Dead Seeks His Murderer, was also shot using Peter van Eyck as the main actor. Brauner decided to quit this after Station Six Sahara was created.

Ron Grainer and Jack Stephens worked together on the film. Grainer did the composition while Stephens did the building designs.

It was shot mostly in London at Shepperton Studios with some location work in Libya. As a female in Libya, Baker's movements were heavily restricted.

The 1938 French film, "S.O.S. Sahara", is similar to the film Station Six Sahara.

Reception
The film was reasonably successful on its release in both Britain and Germany. Station Six Sahara received 6.4 out of 10 stars out of over 450 reviewers with a few of those coming from expert critics.

Critical reception
The topic is basically banal: five men on an abandoned oil station in the desert are driven crazy with sex by a beautiful blonde woman who arrives suddenly. However, this action omits the essential: the desolation of the scorching wasteland and the opposition of the characters make up the content of the German-English film. How a newcomer to the small crew coldly gets involved in a showdown with the arrogant boss, how a macabre letter deal is concluded; that fits psychologically and seals the atmosphere. Only when the woman arouses desire does the action become 'ordinary'. To praise the fit of the tangible dialogues, the photography, and the actors. The actors were Ian Bannen, Deholm Elliott, Biff McGuire, Hansjörg Felmy, Peter van Eyck, Mario Adorf, and The Alluring Depravity: Carroll Baker.

- Hamburger Abendblatt of April 24, 1963

In Filme 1962/1964, the following can be read: "Realistically hard in style, unbelievable in plot and ethically pointless."

In the Lexicon of International Film it says: "Not without skill, the director's realistic stylistic devices distract from the implausibility of the desert adventure."

With all due respect to Carroll Baker's all-too-visible charm as the ephemeral seductress who ruins a small oil-drilling outstation, 'Station Six Sahara' would be better off without her. (...) Indeed, in the first half hour or so, there are very real odds for this British melodrama as a cynical, caustic close-up of desert boredom and petty friction. (...) When Miss Baker shows up in a random car accident, the boys immediately start chasing after her.(...) What begins as a murderous irony becomes a steamy farce that could hardly be more meaningless. The purring Miss Baker seems perfectly at home in no man's land, but she also manages to seduce throughout the film.

- The New York Times of November 12, 1964

One of those expert movie critics that reviewed the film is Karl Williams. Karl Williams, within his review, states "American audiences were disappointed" with missing scenes from the film in the American version, especially the "nude scenes of Carroll Baker". Another expert critic that reviewed the movie was Derek Winnert. Derek Winnert wrote in his article that the film has an "enjoyably lurid and melodramatic cocktail of sun, sea, sweat, and sleaze" and is "tingling with tension". Within Winnert's article, he also brings up a review from a well-known British critic named Dilys Powell in which she called the film a piece of "true cinema".

One of the largest newspapers in the Britain, The Times, also reviewed the film. The famous newspaper wrote that it was the "first British film with erotic tension that is palpable on the screen". Another newspaper that wrote about the film was The New York Times, one of the most well-known newspapers in the U.S. The New York Times said that the film would have been "better off without Carroll Baker" and that the movie was better before she showed up in the film.

The film was greatly admired by Martin Scorsese.

References

Bibliography 
 Bergfelder, Tim. International Adventures: German Popular Cinema and European Co-productions in the 1960s. Berghahn Books, 2005.

External links 
 
 
Review of film at New York Times

1963 films
1963 drama films
British drama films
German drama films
West German films
English-language German films
1960s German-language films
Films directed by Seth Holt
British black-and-white films
Films shot in Libya
British remakes of French films
British remakes of German films
British films based on plays
German films based on plays
Films set in deserts
British Lion Films films
Films scored by Ron Grainer
Films with screenplays by Bryan Forbes
1960s English-language films
Films set in the Sahara
1960s British films
1960s German films